The 2016 Virsligas Winter Cup is the league cup's fourth season. It began on 18 January 2015. Skonto are the defending champion.

Group stage
The top two from each group advance to the Knockout stage. The third placed teams play each other to determine two more teams to join them.

Group A

Group B

Position play–off

Fifth–Eighth place

Seventh–Eighth place

Fifth–Sixth place

Knockout stage

Semi-finals

Third place play-off

Final

References

Virsligas Winter Cup
Virsligas Winter Cup